Suman Shetty is an Indian actor known for his comic roles. He appears in Telugu and Tamil Films. He won the Nandi Award for Best Male Comedian for his comic role in Jayam film.

Filmography
Telugu films

Tamil films

References

External links
 

Telugu male actors
Year of birth missing (living people)
Male actors in Tamil cinema
Indian male film actors
Living people
Tamil comedians
Telugu comedians